The television series The West Wing is a political drama series which was originally broadcast on NBC.

During its seven seasons the ensemble cast of stars, recurring stars, and guest stars earned 157 acting nominations (often competing in the same category against other members of the cast) across a variety of award-granting organizations, earning 30 awards. Many actors noted for work in sitcoms appeared in dramatic roles on The West Wing, including John Goodman, Alan Alda, John Larroquette, Christopher Lloyd, Ed O'Neill, Matthew Perry, Patricia Richardson, Lily Tomlin, Wayne Wilderson, and Daniel von Bargen.

Main cast 
  = Main cast (credited) 
  = Recurring cast (2+)

White House staff 

 Madeline "Mandy" Hampton  (Moira Kelly): Political consultant during Bartlet's first campaign. Worked as a media consultant at Lennox-Chase after the campaign.  Briefly consults for Democratic Senator Lloyd Russell before being hired by the White House as a political consultant and Media Director (Season 1). She is not seen or mentioned again after the first season.
 Angela Blake  (Michael Hyatt): Worked for Leo McGarry while he was Secretary of Labor . While a political consultant, she is hired to be Director of Legislative Affairs (Season 5). She is not seen or mentioned again after the budget crisis is over and Josh Lyman regains his effective leadership.
 Clifford "Cliff" Calley  (Mark Feuerstein): Majority Counsel for the House Government Reform and Oversight Committee during the Bartlet censure proceedings (Season 3) and a Republican; White House Deputy Chief of Staff (Season 6–7). During the censure hearings, he helps facilitate a schedule delay which allows Leo McGarry to avoid potentially damaging testimony.
 Amelia "Amy" Gardner  (Mary-Louise Parker): Head of the Women's Leadership Coalition and influential women's rights activist. Works as a political consultant for Senator Howard Stackhouse when he runs for president. Later hired as the Chief of Staff for the Office of the First Lady. Resigns after she upsets the President (Seasons 3–5). Agrees to become the Director of Legislative Affairs in the Santos administration (Season 7).

Other White House staffers 

  (Kathryn Joosten and Kirsten Nelson in flashback in "Two Cathedrals"): The President's executive secretary (Season 1–2). Killed in a car accident (Season 2 episode "18th and Potomac"). Appears in flashbacks (Seasons 3–4). Often referred to simply as "Mrs Landingham".
 Deborah "Debbie" Fiderer (Lily Tomlin): The President's executive secretary. Hired after the death of Mrs Landingham (Seasons 4–7). Charlie arranges for her first interview with the President, where she is groggy from prescription medication and performs very badly, and pushes successfully for her to be re-considered afterwards. When President Bartlet learns the reason she lost her previous White House job—she defied the Director of Personnel by hiring Charlie rather than a wealthy Bartlet supporter's unqualified son—and sees she is actually very smart and capable, he hires her on the spot.
 Margaret Hooper (NiCole Robinson): Assistant to Chiefs of Staff Leo McGarry (Seasons 1–6) and C. J. Cregg (Seasons 6–7). She is visibly pregnant in Season 6, with no clear information about the father, and her baby is never seen on the show.
 Bonnie (Devika Parikh): Assistant to Communications Director Toby Ziegler (Seasons 1–5).
 Carol Fitzpatrick (Melissa Fitzgerald): Assistant to Press Secretary C. J. Cregg (Seasons 1–7).
 Ginger (Kim Webster): Assistant to Communications Director Toby Ziegler and Deputy Communications Director Sam Seaborn (Seasons 1-7).
 Cathy (Suzy Nakamura): Assistant to Deputy Communications Director Sam Seaborn (Season 1).
 Elsie Snuffin (Danica McKellar): Assistant to Deputy Communications Director Will Bailey, as well as his stepsister (Season 4).
 Cassie Tatum (Claire Coffee): Intern at the White House Press Office (Season 4).
 Lauren Romano (Lara Phillips): Intern at the White House Press Office (Season 4).
 Lauren Shelby (Kimberlee Peterson): Intern at the White House Press Office (Season 4).
 Lauren Chin (Catherine Kwong): Intern at the White House Press Office (Season 4).
 Marina ("Rina") (Melissa Marsala): Assistant to Communications Director Toby Ziegler (Season 5). Causes consternation among staff members by wearing revealing outfits in the West Wing office areas, raising concerns over potential harassment complaints or perceived lack of professionalism.
 Nancy (Renée Estevez): President's Confidential Assistant (Seasons 1–7). Estevez is the daughter of Martin Sheen, who plays the President.
 Ed (Peter James Smith): White House staffer usually seen with Larry.
 Larry (William Duffy): White House staffer usually seen with Ed.
 Ryan Pierce (Jesse Bradford): White House intern assigned to Josh and nephew of a powerful senator; related to the 14th U.S. president, Franklin Pierce (Season 5). Becomes a top aide to a Democratic Congressman whom Josh hates by the end of Season 5, and is not seen or mentioned afterwards.
 Curtis Carruthers (Ben Murray): Succeeds Charlie Young as personal aide to the President (Season 6).

Office of the White House Counsel 

 Lionel Tribbey (John Larroquette): The fourth White House Counsel of the Bartlet administration, but the first to appear in the series. He has very liberal views and is animated and theatrical.
 Oliver Babish (Oliver Platt): The fifth and final White House Counsel of the Bartlet administration, but the second of the two characters to be shown in that position during the series. Diligent and zealous, he first appears advising President Bartlet when the President is considering revealing his diagnosis of multiple sclerosis to the public. He appears connected to this plotline into season three, then returns to the series in season seven to participate in the White House's internal investigation into the military shuttle leak. He later decamps to a law firm in the wake of the outgoing Bartlet Administration and later mentioned by Santos as a potential choice for Attorney General. Described by Josh Lyman as "smart and tough".
 Ainsley Hayes (Emily Procter): Associate (and proposed Deputy) White House Counsel (Seasons 2–3). Conservative Republican from North Carolina. Graduate of Harvard Law School. After she soundly defeats and embarrasses Sam during a debate on the political talk show Capital Beat, President Bartlet tells Leo McGarry to offer her a job, which she initially thinks is either a joke or a terrible idea, but seeing the staff in action leads her to accept the Associate White House Counsel's post. Briefly reappears in Season 7, wanting to become White House Counsel for the Santos Administration with Josh planning on getting her a meeting with Santos.
 Joe Quincy (Matthew Perry): Associate White House Counsel (Seasons 4–5). Republican. Uncovers Vice President Hoynes's leaking of information during an affair with local socialite Helen Baldwin, ultimately leading to Hoynes' resignation.
 Mike Wayne (Benjamin Brown): Associate White House Counsel (Season 4–7). Deals with Toby after he admits to being the source of the military space shuttle leak.
 Richard Squire (Michael Kostroff): Associate White House Counsel (Season 6). Graduate of Yale Law School and a Rhodes Scholar.

Situation Room 

 Admiral Percy "Fitz" Fitzwallace (John Amos): Chairman of the Joint Chiefs of Staff (Seasons 1–5). Fitzwallace is a career surface warfare officer. He is killed by terrorists while on a diplomatic mission following his retirement. 
 General Nicholas Alexander (Terry O'Quinn): an ex-Green Beret. He succeeds Admiral Fitzwallace as Chairman of the Joint Chiefs of Staff (Seasons 5–6).
 Dr. Nancy McNally (Anna Deavere Smith): National Security Advisor. It is suggested that she becomes U.S. Ambassador to the United Nations (Seasons 2–7). 
 Lieutenant Commander Jack Reese (Christian Slater): Aide to National Security Advisor Nancy McNally (Season 4) and briefly dates Donna.
 Commander Kate Harper (Mary McCormack): Deputy National Security Advisor (Seasons 5–7).
 Lieutenant General Alan Adamle (Gerald McRaney): A three-star general in the USAF. Meets with Leo to discuss the International Criminal Court in episode 3.05 and stuns Leo by revealing Leo once (completely inadvertently) bombed a non-military target and killed innocent civilians, telling a devastated Leo this story to lead to his view that "All wars are crimes." Also briefs then President-elect Bartlet on a small delegation of military advisers being sent to the Philippines three days after the presidential election in episode 5.22. Served with Leo in Vietnam.
 General Shannon (Daniel von Bargen): Appears in episodes (2.01) and (2.10). A four-star general in the USAF; Leo calls him "Jack" in his first episode and "Ken" in his second appearance. He seems to be the senior officer in the Situation Room in episode 2.01 until Nancy McNally arrives.
 Lieutenant General Ed Barrie (Tom Bower): Army Chief of Staff. Appears in episode 2.05 berating C.J. for reprimanding his intentions to criticize the President on TV before his retirement, but is left silent when C.J. tells him he is wearing a Distinguished Combat Service Medal he had not earned; President Bartlet, however, later says the General served his country bravely and would face no White House censorship of any of his views. Despite being identified as Army Chief of Staff, he is portrayed as a three-star lieutenant general.
 General Mitch Jensen (Christopher Kriesa): A three-star Army general. Present in the Situation Room during discussions of retaliatory options to Morris Tollivers' USAF medical transport being shot down in episode 1.03. Also advises the President on the India-Kashmir crisis in episodes 1.11 and 1.12.
 Colonel Mark Chase (David Graf): Air Force officer who advises Leo on a crisis with Iraqi oil smugglers in episode 2.07, and monitors the Missile Defense Shield test in episode 2.12.
 CIA Director George Rollie (Ryan Cutrona): President Bartlet does not trust or like him, but as C.J. and Toby note in "365 Days", his pariah status is useful because it prevents the President from tearing down anyone else during tense situations.
 Mr. Cashman : often mentioned alongside Secretaries Hutchinson and Berryhill, implied to be a senior official at one of the Executive Branch departments, the department of either State or Defense (Seasons 1–2).
 Bobby Dunn (Gary Cervantes): Appears in episodes (1.11), (1.22), (2.01), (2.10), and (2.21); apparently a State Department official.
 Albie Duncan (Hal Holbrook): Assistant Secretary of State (office unstated). Longtime Republican and State Department elder (more than 40 years); is brought in by Leo (to the President's displeasure) to counsel the President on the submarine crisis off of North Korea in episode (3.06); later brought in by Toby during the reelection campaign to help C.J. spin the post-debate in episode (4.06).
 Ted Barrow (Ron Canada): Assistant Secretary of State for East Asian and Pacific Affairs. Appears in Seasons 5–7. In Season 5, tends to be harsh with the senior staffers and notably sympathetic to the views of North Korea; in later appearances, he is more measured and diplomatic.
 Bob Slattery (Thomas Kopache): Assistant Secretary of State for Near Eastern Affairs. Appears in Seasons 3–7.
 Miguel "Mickey" Troop (Tony Plana): Assistant Secretary of State for Western Hemisphere Affairs. Appears in Season 2; advises the President on the DEA hostage crisis in Colombia, where he pushes for negotiations over a military solution and later outlines how dangerous and deadly a U.S. war against the major cartels would be.
 Mike Chysler (Glenn Morshower): (occasionally "Jack"); adviser to the President during his first term, regularly appearing in the Situation Room. Briefs the President on the DEA hostage crisis; also advises the President during the prelude to the assassination of Abdul Shareef near the end of Season 3. Appears in Seasons 2–4.

Secret Service/FBI 
 Ron Butterfield (Michael O'Neill): Head of the President's Secret Service detail (Seasons 1–7).
 Simon Donovan (Mark Harmon): Secret Service agent assigned to protect C. J. Cregg and develops a close relationship with her. Killed when he walks into an armed robbery (Season 3).
 Gina Toscano (Jorja Fox): Secret Service agent assigned to protect Zoey Bartlet (Seasons 1–2).
 Wesley Davis (Taye Diggs): In charge of Zoey Bartlet's secret service detail when she is abducted (Season 4).
 Molly O'Connor (Kimberly Bigsby): A young agent on Zoey's detail. Shot dead during Zoey's kidnapping. Toby and Andy's daughter is named in her memory (Season 4).
 Randy Weathers (Shannon Marshall): Another young agent on Zoey Bartlet's detail (Season 4).
 Jamie Reed (John Antonini): Another young agent on Zoey Bartlet's detail (Season 4).
 Tom Connelly: FBI Director. Referred to in episode (Ep. 1.03).
 George Arnold (Michael Kagan): FBI Director (Ep. 5.18; 6.1).
 Mike Casper (Clark Gregg): FBI Special Agent, usually acting White House liaison (Seasons 2–5).

Politicians

Federal executive branch 
 Matt Santos (Jimmy Smits): Democratic candidate for president in 2006 (Seasons 6–7). Succeeds Josiah Bartlet as President of the United States. (Season 7). Three-term U.S. Representative from Texas. Frustrated at legislative setbacks in the House, Santos is on the verge of announcing a decision not to seek re-election, but instead is convinced by Josh Lyman to launch a long-shot campaign for the presidency.
 John Hoynes (Tim Matheson): President Bartlet's first Vice President. President Bartlet's rival for the 1998 Democratic presidential nomination. Resigned from office while under fire for leaking classified material to a woman he was having an affair with. Candidate for the Democratic nomination for the 2006 election. (Seasons 1–4 and appearances in Season 5, 6 and 7)
 Robert "Bob" Russell (Gary Cole): President Bartlet's vice president after the resignation of John Hoynes and a candidate for the Democratic nomination for the 2006 election. (Seasons 5–7)
 Lewis Berryhill (William Devane): Secretary of State. Was nearly nominated by President Bartlet for the office of vice president after John Hoynes' resignation. (Seasons 4–7)
 Miles Hutchinson (Steve Ryan): Secretary of Defense. Often disagreed, loudly and at length, with the policy decisions of President Bartlet. (Seasons 4–7)

Federal legislative branch 
 Senator Seth Gillette (Ed Begley, Jr.): Democrat from North Dakota. Threatened to run against President Bartlet as a third-party candidate on a more left-wing platform in the 2002 election. (Ep 2.14)
 Rep. Jeff Haffley (Steven Culp): Republican from Washington; House Majority Whip, 1997–2003, Speaker of the House, 2003–2007
 Senator Howard Stackhouse (George Coe) Democrat from Minnesota. Ran a liberal third-party candidacy for the Presidency in 2002 but later endorsed President Bartlet. (Ep 2–17, 4.04, 4–06)
 Senator Arnold Vinick (Alan Alda): Republican from California. Republican candidate for president in 2006 (Seasons 6–7). Nominee for Secretary of State in Santos Administration (Season 7). Senator from 1983 to 2007, was California's senior US Senator in 2006. Chairman of a powerful Senate Committee (either Judiciary or Finance), and also served on the Foreign Relations and Environment Committees
 Rep. Glen Allen Walken (John Goodman): Republican from Missouri; House Majority Whip, 1995–1997; House Majority Leader, 1997–2001; Speaker of the House, 2001–2003. Became Acting President of the United States when President Bartlet temporarily relinquished power. Later a contender for the Republican presidential nomination in the 2006 election, though he never appeared on screen in that capacity.

State governors 
 Eric Baker (Ed O'Neill): Governor of Pennsylvania. Widely tipped as a front runner for the Democratic nomination for president in 2006, Baker's surprise decision not to run at the outset leaves the race wide open. When the convention is deadlocked, Baker enters the race from the floor as a draft candidate, but withdraws over fallout due to the discovery of his non-disclosure of his wife's depression. Nominated for vice president by President Santos following the death of Leo McGarry.
 Robert Ritchie (James Brolin): Governor of Florida. Republican nominee for president in 2002, defeated by the incumbent, President Bartlet.
Ray Sullivan (Brett Cullen): Governor of West Virginia. Republican nominee for vice president in 2006. Served as a U.S. Attorney and Attorney General of West Virginia before becoming governor. (Seasons 6–7)

Foreign officials 
 Maureen Graty (Pamela Salem): Prime Minister of the United Kingdom (Season 6)
 Lord John Marbury (Roger Rees) is first introduced as the former British High Commissioner to India and an expert on the Indian subcontinent. He is later appointed Ambassador from the United Kingdom. Known for his colorful and flamboyant personality, he frequently pretends to mistake White House Chief of Staff Leo McGarry for the White House butler (calling him 'Gerald') and outwardly flirts with First Lady Abigail Bartlet. In one episode, he lists his noble titles as including "Marquess of Needham and Dolby" and "Earl of Croy;" however, "Lord John Marbury" or "Lord John," as he is usually addressed, would be more consistent with his being the younger son of a duke or marquess, not a peer in his own right. (Ep. 1.11; 1.12; 2.12; 3.16; 6.14)
 Defense Minister Abdul ibn Shareef of Qumar (Al No'mani): Brother of the Sultan and terrorist leader, assassinated by the United States. (Ep. 3.22)

Campaign staff 
 Bruno Gianelli (Ron Silver): A sharp political operative and consultant introduced in the third season as the campaign manager of Bartlet's 2002 bid for reelection, and continues in this role through the fourth season. His unmatched track record of victories includes a House district that no Democrat has won for decades, several different U.S. senators and state governors, as well as a win for an unspecified Israeli prime minister. The character reappears as Eric Baker's campaign manager for the 2006 Democratic primary, only to become an independent consultant to Republican nominee Arnold Vinick after Baker withdraws from the race. The change of political affiliations mirrored Ron Silver's real-world change of party affiliation, as the noted liberal actor campaigned for President George W. Bush in the 2004 presidential election.
 Josephine "Joey" Lucas (Marlee Matlin): A political consultant and pollster who is often hired by the White House and Democratic campaigns. Usually her interactions with Bartlet or Matt Santos are arranged by Josh Lyman, who has a crush on her early on. However, their relationship remains platonic and professional. Lucas first appears in the first season as the hard-hitting, sarcastic campaign manager for a Democratic House candidate whom the White House does not take seriously. She is then contracted to conduct a secret poll to determine whether the American public would accept the president's MS. Like Matlin, Lucas is deaf.
 Kenny Thurman (Bill O'Brien): Joey Lucas's sign language interpreter (Seasons 1–7).
 Connie Tate (Connie Britton): Bartlet-Hoynes re-election campaign staffer (Season 3); a likable woman who quickly befriends Sam Seaborn. Often wins points by smoothing feathers ruffled by her acerbic co-worker Doug Wegland.
 Doug Wegland (Evan Handler): Bartlet-Hoynes re-election campaign staffer and speechwriter (Season 3); he is acerbic and finds himself offside with Toby Ziegler, but ends up winning the staffers' respect with his good ideas and staunch belief in them (particularly his push for a presidential veto on the "death tax" that leads to a major political victory for the administration).
 Kevin Kahn (Patrick Breen): Former friend of Sam Seaborn. Staffer on Ritchie's 2002 presidential campaign (Season 3), who ends up humiliating Sam by leaking an attack ad that makes the Bartlet campaign look vindictive and stupid.
 Dylan Clark (Tim Kelleher): Hoynes' campaign manager (Season 6).

Santos campaign 
 Louise "Lou" Thornton (Janeane Garofalo): an intelligent lobbyist described by Santos as having a "completely different take on the campaign" and by Josh as knowing "image stuff backwards and sideways", she only reluctantly agrees to Josh's request to join the Santos-McGarry campaign as Director of Communications, when Santos agrees she can report to him directly. She acts as Josh's de facto deputy throughout the campaign, and at Josh's persuasion, accepts her appointment as Santos's Director of Communications (Season 7).
 Ronna Beckman (Karis Campbell): Santos's personal assistant. She is present from the very beginning of Matt Santos's campaign for the presidency in season 6 (appearing as part of his Congressional staff). In her final appearance, Deborah Fiderer trains her as Santos's executive secretary, warning her never to revoke the First Lady's walk-in privileges, even as the President is certain to request it. She has a relationship with another female staffer (Cindy) on the Santos campaign.
 Edie Ortega (Diana-Maria Riva): Santos-McGarry Deputy Campaign Manager for Strategic Planning (Season 7).
 Lester (Cress Williams): Santos-McGarry Campaign Consultant (Season 7).
 Bram Howard (Matthew Del Negro): Staffer, Santos-McGarry Campaign (Seasons 6–7); Santos Administration counselor to the President (Season 7). Moves into Charlie Young's former office on Inauguration Day.
 Ned Carlson (Evan Arnold): A day-one aide to Congressman Santos (Season 6); Staffer, Santos-McGarry Campaign (Seasons 6–7). He is removed from the campaign and reassigned to Santos's Congressional office early in Season 7 after Lou considers that he is out of his depth.
 Otto (Ramon De Ocampo): Speechwriter, Santos-McGarry Campaign (Season 7); Staffer in the Santos Administration (Season 7). Very young but capable man who has a campaign fling with Lou Thornton.  It is implied he will have a speechwriting role in the Santos Administration.

Vinick campaign 
 Sheila Brooks (Patricia Richardson): Senator Vinick's chief of staff and Vinick-Sullivan campaign manager; She, like Vinick, is portrayed as level-headed and not overtly partisan. Often at odds with the more conservative voices in the party, she leaves the campaign weeks before election day to placate the Republican base (Season 6–7). In her final appearance, Brooks is mentioned as possibly being hired as Chief of Staff to the Republican Senate Majority Leader. Having renewed her friendship with Vinick, she makes an argument that convinces the Senator that he should not run for president again—and that he should accept President-elect Santos' offer to become the next Secretary of State.
 Jane Braun (Melinda McGraw): Vinick-Sullivan campaign manager after Brooks' resignation (Season 7); A far to the right conservative activist who replaces Sheila in order to energize hard-core GOP voters. However, she disgusts the rest of the campaign leadership by attempting to make an election night issue of Leo McGarry's death. Her outspoken partisanship puts her at odds with Vinick, Sheila, and Bruno Gianelli.
 Bruno Gianelli (Ron Silver): (See above).
 Bob Mayer (Stephen Root): Vinick-Sullivan speechwriter (Season 6–7). Frequently mocked for his messy eating habits but extremely smart and effective (and, like Vinick and Sheila Brooks, level-headed in his conservatism), Mayer becomes fast friends with Gianelli. On election night, the two briefly discuss forming a consulting firm when Mayer firmly declares he is never going to become involved in daily governance, but Gianelli politely declines because the campaign life has worn him down and he plans to retire to his home in upstate New York. Along with Sheila, Bob advises Vinick to accept Santos' offer as the next Secretary of State.

Media 
 Danny Concannon; (Timothy Busfield): senior White House correspondent for The Washington Post and love interest for C.J. Cregg; the two have a child together and have been living together for three years (marriage not confirmed in dialogue) as revealed in the last episode (Seasons 1–2, 4–5, 7).
 Greg Brock (Sam Robards): White House correspondent for The New York Times. Greg Brock is also the name of a real editor for The New York Times. One of the most regularly referred to White House correspondents, second only to Danny Concannon. Writes a story that alleges the existence of a classified military space shuttle which could be used to help three astronauts on the International Space Station who are running out of oxygen. His source is initially suspected to be C. J. Cregg, whose phone records show a surprisingly large number of calls to Greg Brock. Brock goes to jail after being held in contempt of court for failing to reveal the name of his source. White House Communications Director Toby Ziegler eventually confesses to the leak, saying that he acted alone, and that Brock was the only reporter to whom he leaked the information. The storyline regarding the leak and subsequent investigation has been compared by some to the Valerie Plame affair. (Seasons 5–7).
 Roger Salier (Ivan Allen): Television anchor on News Center 4 (Seasons 1–7).
 Mark Gottfried (Ted McGinley): Talk show host of Capital Beat (Episodes 2.04, 2.13 & 2.14).
 Diane Mathers (Kathrin Middleton): Tough talk show host who interviews Zoey Bartlet about her kidnapping and John Hoynes about his intentions to run for president again (Episodes 5.07 & 6.07).
 Taylor Reid (Jay Mohr): Conservative talk show host, baits C. J. Cregg by calling her a "chicken" (Season 5). Some reviewers have likened the character to Bill O'Reilly, the combative host of the news commentary show The O'Reilly Factor.
 Will Sawyer (Michael O'Keefe): Appears in the episode "War Crimes" (Season 3.05) as a White House correspondent while awaiting a new overseas assignment after escaping from Myanmar.
 Katarina "Katie" Witt (Kris Murphy): White House Press Corps Reporter (Seasons 1–7).
 Mark O'Donnell (Timothy Davis-Reed): White House Press Corps Reporter. Episode 3:08 – says he is from Canada. (Season 2–7)
 Steve (Charles Noland): White House Press Corps Reporter, from AP. (Season 1–7)
 Chris (Mindy Seeger): White House Press Corps Reporter. (Season 1–7)
 Charlayne (Joyce Guy): White House Press Corps Reporter. (Season 5–7)
 Gordon (Tom Chick): White House Press Corps Reporter. (Season 5–7)

Family

Josiah Bartlet's family 
 Abigail Ann 'Abbey' Bartlet, M.D. (Stockard Channing): First Lady of the United States (Seasons 1–7).
 Jonathan Bartlet: Younger brother of Josiah Bartlet (mentioned, never seen).
 Elizabeth "Liz" Bartlet Westin (Annabeth Gish): The President's eldest daughter, married with two children. (Seasons 5–7). President Bartlet thinks she is the real political mind in her marriage (not her husband) and she should run for office instead of him.
 Eleanor Emily "Ellie" Bartlet Faison, M.D. (Nina Siemaszko): The President's middle daughter.(Seasons 2, 5, 7). Loves her father and he loves her but they're very different in personality and President Bartlet has said that Ellie is "her mother's daughter".
 Zoey Patricia Bartlet (Elisabeth Moss): The President's youngest daughter (Seasons 1–2, 4–7).
 Dr. Bartlet (Lawrence O'Donnell): The President's father. Though deceased, he appears during flashbacks in the episode "Two Cathedrals" (Season 2). In flashback form, he is an overbearing man described by Mrs Landingham as a "prig who was jealous of his more successful brothers" and took out his limitations on his brilliant leader of a son.
 Doug Westin (Steven Eckholdt): Liz's husband. Neither the President nor his senior staff think much of him: the President because he does not think Doug is really worthy of marrying Elizabeth, the staff because they view him as an empty suit. Has an adulterous affair with the family's nanny exposed and unsuccessfully runs for the House of Representatives representing New Hampshire in 2006 (Seasons 5–7).
 Vic Faison (Ben Weber): Ellie's fiancé, later husband. A scientist studying fruit flies, he earned President Barlet's respect when he admitted that he was not marrying Ellie due to her being pregnant but knew Ellie was the one on their third date. Vic has difficulty coping with the fact that his wedding has become a state occasion, but comes to terms with it.(Season 7).
 Annie Westin: The President's granddaughter and Liz's daughter. Age 12 in Season 1. (Season 5, Episode 1).
 Gus Westin (Michael Krepack): The President's grandson and Liz's son (Season 5).

Leo McGarry's family 
 Mallory O'Brien (Allison Smith): Leo McGarry's daughter (Seasons 1–2, 4–7).
 Jenny McGarry (Sara Botsford): Leo McGarry's wife.  Divorces him due to his work commitments (Season 1).
 Josephine McGarry (Deborah Hedwall): Leo McGarry's sister, who works as an educator (Season 2). Avowedly against school prayer, and is forced to withdraw from consideration for a position with the Department of Education when Leo finds out she ordered the arrest of students who were praying and arranging for the arrest to be publicized.
 Elizabeth McGarry: Leo McGarry's sister, mentioned in the episode "In Excelsis Deo" (Season 1).

C. J. Cregg's family 
 Hogan Cregg (Evan Rachel Wood): C.J.'s niece (Season 3).
 Molly Lapham Cregg (Verna Bloom): C.J.'s stepmother and her former high school English teacher (Season 4).
 Talmidge Cregg (Donald Moffat): C.J.'s father, a retired math teacher with Alzheimer's disease (Season 4).
 Grammy Cregg: Mentioned as the Midwestern source of C.J.'s "Hay is for Horses" witticism.
 Two older brothers: Mentioned in "The Black Vera Wang".
 Danny Concannon (Timothy Busfield): senior White House correspondent for The Washington Post and love interest for C.J. Cregg; the two have a child together and have been living together for three years (marriage not confirmed in dialogue) as revealed in the last episode (Seasons 1–2, 4–5, 7).

Josh Lyman's family 
Joanie Lyman: Josh's older sister who died in a fire when she was babysitting him.
Noah Lyman: Josh's father, a successful lawyer and longtime Democratic Party supporter, who was good friends with Leo McGarry. Died on the night of the Illinois primary (during Bartlet's first presidential campaign).
Mrs. Lyman: Josh's mother and only living relative. She lives in Florida and Josh usually visits her during holidays.

Toby Ziegler's family 
 Andrea Wyatt (Kathleen York): Ex-wife of Toby Ziegler, Congresswoman from Maryland.
 Molly Wyatt: Toby and Andrea's daughter, named after Molly O'Conner, the secret service agent shot and killed the night of Zoey Bartlet's kidnapping, the night of her and Huck's birth (Seasons 4, 7). 
 Huckleberry "Huck" Wyatt: Toby and Andrea's son, named after Andrea's grandfather (Seasons 4, 7).
 Jules "Julie" Ziegler (Jerry Adler): Toby's father, former member of Murder Incorporated, retired ladies' raincoat maker (Season 4).
 David Ziegler:(mentioned, never seen) Toby's brother, NASA astronaut, who dies by suicide in Season 6 following a cancer diagnosis.

Donna Moss's family 
 Aunt Barbara: Aunt from Wisconsin whom Donna leads on private tour. (Season 5)
 Uncle Ted: Uncle from Wisconsin whom Donna leads on private tour. (Season 5)
 Cousins in Oklahoma: Mentioned in "Disaster Relief" (Season 5)
 Mother: Comes to visit when Donna is hospitalized in Germany after the Gaza attack.

Will Bailey's family 
 Elsie Snuffin (Danica McKellar): Will Bailey's stepsister. 
 Thomas Bailey: Will's father, a former Supreme Allied Commander Europe.

Charlie Young's family 
 Deanna Young: Charlie's younger sister.
 Mrs Young: Charlie's mother, a Washington, D.C. policewoman who was shot and killed in the line of duty prior to the start of the series by a gunman who was never arrested. (Mentioned, seen only in a photo.)
 Grandparents: Mentioned in "The State Dinner" as living in Georgia and not getting around too well

Matt Santos's family 
 Helen Santos (Teri Polo): Matt Santos's wife (Season 6–7)
 Peter Santos (Joshua Cabrera): Matt Santos's son (Season 6–7)
 Miranda Santos (Ashlyn Sanchez): Matt Santos's daughter (Season 6–7)
 Jorge Santos (David Barrera): Matt's Santos's brother (Season 7), a failure in life who nearly ruins his brother's presidential bid when the Vinick campaign thinks they have evidence Matt Santos has an illegitimate child (in fact, Matt discovered that Jorge refused to support his ex-girlfriend, and therefore set up secret payments to help her on his own).

Other characters 

 Laurie (Lisa Edelstein): Sam Seaborn's friend. Law student working as a call girl (Season 1 and mentioned several times in 2).
 Al Kiefer (John de Lancie): Democratic pollster who had a short relationship with Joey Lucas. The senior staff cannot stand him and when Joey's abilities became apparent, she takes over his previous role as the Bartlet Administration's top pollster. (Season 1)
 Larry Claypool (John Diehl): Freedom Watch lawyer (Seasons 1, 4) who spends his time filing lawsuits against President Bartlet and his staff in hopes of bringing down the administration.
 Bernard Thatch (Paxton Whitehead): Head of the White House Visitor's Office (Ep 2.10, Ep 6.07).
 Ann Stark (Felicity Huffman): Toby Ziegler's former friend, until she betrays him when he tries to broker a compromise on patients' rights.  Chief of Staff to the Senate Majority Leader (Ep 2.11)
 Roberto Mendoza (Edward James Olmos): Short-list nominee and later confirmed Associate Justice of the Supreme Court. (Ep 1.9, Ep 1.15)
 Lisa Sherborne (Traylor Howard): Sam Seaborn's former fiancée who now works for Vanity Fair. Sam broke off their engagement because he wanted to leave the New York scene and work at the White House (Ep 3.11).
 Dr. Stanley Keyworth (Adam Arkin): A psychiatrist from San Francisco who specializes in trauma cases. He is asked by Leo McGarry to see Josh after Josh yells at the President. Staff Therapist for the American Trauma Victims Association (ATVA), has several sessions as the President's therapist as well. (Seasons 2–4)
 Jordon Elaine Kendall (Joanna Gleason): Leo McGarry's lawyer during the Bartlet MS hearings and love interest for several months. (Season 3–4)
 Tabatha Fortis (Laura Dern): United States Poet Laureate (Season 3.16)
 Alana Waterman (Lee Garlington): Toby Ziegler's attorney, called upon when Toby confesses to the White House leak. (Season 7, Garlington also appeared in the pilot episode as a militant anti-abortion activist.)
 Jean Paul Pierre Claude Charpentier, Vicomte de Condé de Bourbon (Trent Ford): Zoey Bartlet's French boyfriend. (Season 4)
 Colin Ayres (Jason Isaacs): Photographer who has a fling with Donna Moss in "Gaza". (Season 5–6)
 Lt. Colonel Gantry: pilot of Air Force One, heard several times on personal announcements on the plane.
 Colonel Jesse Weisskopf (James Morrison): pilot of Air Force One, seen in the episode "Angel Maintenance" (Season 4) informing the President on the status of the plane.
 Dr. Millicent Griffith (Mary Kay Place): Close family friend of the Bartlets, Ellie's godmother, occasional medical adviser to the President, and President Bartlet's Surgeon General (Ep. 2.15, Ep. 6.08, Ep. 6.09; mentioned in Ep. 2.18).
 Reverend Don Butler (Don S. Davis): A conservative televangelist from Virginia, who is a candidate for the Republican Party's nomination for President of the United States in the 2006 election, but is defeated by Arnold Vinick and politely declines Vinick's offer of the Vice President spot because he cannot support Vinick's pro-choice positions.
 Bobby Zane (Noah Emmerich): Defense lawyer for a convicted murderer and high school bully of Sam Seaborn.  He contacts Sam in order to persuade the White House to commute his client's death sentence (Ep. 1.14).
 Marco (Matthew Modine): A horologist and high school classmate of C. J. Cregg who helps her deal with her father's steady mental decline due to Alzheimer's disease. Appears in the episode "The Long Goodbye" (Ep. 4.13).
 Morris Tolliver (Ruben Santiago-Hudson): He was a physician and Navy officer (Captain), who served as a temporary replacement at the position of Physician to the President of the United States. Despite his relatively low rank for the position, Jed Bartlet liked him and Leo McGarry asked him to stay on full-time. Before he could assume the position, however, a plane he was on during a diplomatic mission was shot down over the Middle East, which prompted the President to "overreact" in the next episode "A Proportional Response". Dr. Tolliver was married to Angela and their daughter's name was Cory. The child was named for her great-grandmother, who had been named after her great aunt, who got it from the first free woman she ever met. Appears in the episode "Post Hoc, Ergo Propter Hoc" (Ep. 1.2).

 Steve Atwood (Željko Ivanek): Republican Chief of Staff to Glen Allen Walken when he was Speaker of the House. Follows Walken to the White House when the Speaker resigns from his post to step in for Bartlet as president. Finds himself at odds with Josh Lyman, who accuses Atwood of conspiring with Walken and the Republican Party for pushing their agenda during the presidency. Atwood denies it, citing that he and the party are in awe of Bartlet for his actions under the 25th Amendment (Ep. 5.1, Ep. 5.2).

Pets 

 Bess: Glen Allen Walken's pug.
 Gail: C. J. Cregg's pet goldfish.  A gift from Danny Concannon.  In "The Short List" (Ep. 1.9), Josh Lyman tells Danny that C.J. likes "goldfish."  Although Josh is referring to the snack crackers of the same name, Danny mistakenly believes he is referring to the aquatic creature; after giving C.J. the fish, Danny mentions that the pet-store owner had named it "Gail". On the DVD commentary track for Ep. 1.10, "In Excelsis Deo", Aaron Sorkin, Thomas Schlamme, and Alex Graves mention that the prop masters created a miniature Christmas ornament to place on the floor of Gail's fish bowl and that from then on, the prop masters often crafted tiny decorations related to the themes in a given episode. For example, when hostilities were escalating in India and Pakistan, the bowl contained a tiny bomb shelter.
 Henry: Amy Gardner's basset hound.

See also 
 The West Wing
 List of The West Wing episodes

References 

Lists of American television series characters
Lists of drama television characters